Christ carrying the Cross is a 15th century polychrome and oak sculpture attributed to the French sculptor Ligier Richier in the Église de Saint-Laurent in Pont à Mousson in Meurthe-et-Moselle. It is thought to have come from the chapel of "Mount Olive" erected by Philippe de Gueldres in the garden of the Clarisses monastery in Pont-à-Mousson.

The sculpture was designated as a Monument historique in 1934.

Notes

Sources
 Denis, Paul. Ligier Richier, l’artiste et son œuvre. Paris-Nancy: Berger-Levrault, 1911

Sculptures by Ligier Richier